Storys Creek is a  long 4th order tributary to the Hyco River in Person County, North Carolina.

Variant names
According to the Geographic Names Information System, it has also been known historically as:
Satterfield Creek
Stony Creek
Story Creek

Course
Storys Creek rises about 0.5 miles northeast of Roseville, North Carolina, and then flows north-northeast to join the Hyco River about 4 miles north-northwest of Woodsdale.

Watershed
Storys Creek drains  of area, receives about 46.4 in/year of precipitation, has a wetness index of 399.51, and is about 54% forested.

References

Rivers of North Carolina
Rivers of Person County, North Carolina
Tributaries of the Roanoke River